The Minister of Education and Research is the senior minister at the Ministry of Education and Research (Estonian: Eesti Vabariigi Haridus- ja Teadusministeerium) in the Estonian Government. The Minister is responsible for administration and development of Estonian educational system as well as for administration and funding of research and development activities on national level.

The Minister of Education and Research is chosen by the Prime Minister as a part of the government. The current Minister of Education and Research is Tõnis Lukas, who took the position on 18 July 2022.

The Minister is assisted in his/her work by the Deputy Minister, Secretary General, Secretary for General and Vocational Education, Secretary for Higher Education and Research, and Secretary for Youth Affairs and Foreign Relations.

History
Post of the Minister of Education was created at the birth of independent Republic of Estonia on 24 February 1918. From 1928 to 1936 the official title was the Minister of Education and Social Affairs. The end of the Republic of Estonia on 21 June 1940 marked also the end of independent governance of education in Estonia. The Ministry of Education continued from 1940 to 1991 under orders received from Moscow and was merged with the Educational Committee in 1988.

The Ministry of Education was re-established in 1989 to replace the Educational Committee of the Estonian Soviet Socialist Republic. With the restoration of independent Republic of Estonia on 20 August 1991 the Ministry regained its supreme authority on educational issues. In 1993 the ministries of culture and education were merged to form Ministry of Culture and Education. 1996 the old order was restored and a separate Ministry of Education re-established. 2001 the Ministry was relocated to Tartu due to several economic and regional political arguments, but also due to successful lobby by University of Tartu.

On 1 January 2003 the Ministry of Education was renamed to Ministry of Education and Research in order to reflect better its focus and areas of administration. The title of the Minister has changed according to the changes in the name of the Ministry.

Titles
 1918-1928 : Minister of Education
 1928-1940 : Minister of Education and Social Affairs
 1940-1989 : Inexistant
 1989-1992 : Minister of Education 
 1982-1996 : Minister of Culture and Education 
 1996-2003 : Minister of Education 
 Since 2003 : Minister of Education and Research

List of Ministers

1918 to 1940

1989 to Present

References

External links
Ministry of Education and Research official web site

Education and Research
Ministers of Education